Christian Molina is a Spanish director, producer, writer and actor. He raised to popularity by the 2008 Spanish erotic drama Diario de una Ninfómana—better known as Diary of a Sex Addict.

Early life and training 
Christian Molina was born in 1979 at Barcelona, Spain.  His training as a filmmaker was conducted in both Spanish top film schools, the ECAM in Madrid and ESCAC in Barcelona.

Molina has an extensive professional career and has supplemented his training in dozens of movies including "Airbag", "What Women Laugh" and "Memories of Fallen Angel" in which he has participated as a Focus Puller and operator, giving him broad experience in the use of image and light. Molina has worked with leading directors of photography, such as Fernando Arribas, José Luis Alcaine and Paco Femenía.

Career 
In 2004 he directed his first feature film, "Red Blood", narrated a story of losers swiftly and surprisingly reminiscent of the Spanish horror film of the 1970s. In 2006 and 2007 participating as associate producer on the films "Triumph" and "Chuecatown".

In 2008, Christian Molina faces his second challenge as director, Diary of a Nymphomaniac, producing higher economic level and based on the acclaimed best-selling novel by Valérie Tasso, played by actors of the caliber of Belén Fabra, Leonardo Sbaraglia, Geraldine Chaplin, Ángela Molina and Llum Barrera. This film tells the story of Val, a young attractive and intellectual curiosity about sex which will turn it into their lifestyle.

In 2009, his next film. L'Estacio de l'oblit (Station of the Forgotten), was co-directed with Sandra Serna, starring Nilo Mur, and Fermí Reixach Katia Klein, among others. The film is centered on the generation gap between an old sailor (Domingo) and a teenager (Pau).

In 2010, Molina received Marc'Aurelio Alice Nella Citta Under 12 Award for his movie I Want to Be a Soldier at International Rome Film Festival held at the Auditorium Parco Della Musica in Rome, Italy.

In 2011, he made a short movie – Intereses Mundanos Bar Mut. It is about four independent situations of life that by chance come together the same night in the same restaurant, four stories seen from the perspective of the restaurant's soul.

Filmography 

In Camera & Electrical Department

As a director

As a producer or associate producer

References

External links
 *

Living people
1979 births
Spanish film editors
People from Barcelona
Spanish male film actors